The Ultimate Collection is the second greatest hits album by English band Sade, released on 29 April 2011 by RCA Records. The album includes several singles from the band's career, including "Your Love Is King", "Smooth Operator", "By Your Side", "No Ordinary Love" and "Soldier of Love". It also contains four previously unreleased tracks—a cover of Thin Lizzy's 1974 song "Still in Love with You", a remix of "The Moon and the Sky" featuring Jay-Z, and the songs "I Would Have Never Guessed" and "Love Is Found". The band promoted the album with their first concert tour in 10 years, Sade Live. In March 2014, the album was re-released as The Essential Sade under the Sony Legacy umbrella.

Critical reception
Will Hermes of Rolling Stone stated, "Few singers have the consistency of vision to produce a career retrospective that doubles as a seamless 'let's make out on the carpet' mixtape. From 1985's jazzy 'Smooth Operator' to tracks from last year's excellent Soldier of Love, it's all state-of-the-art slow-jams all the time, driven by Sade Adu's touch-me-now contralto." Lloyd Bradley of BBC Music commented, "The best thing about this set is it'll allow anybody who didn't quite get the band first time around to catch up." In a mixed review, Jeff Winbush of All About Jazz wrote, "No such luck. As things stand, a more accurate title would be The Adequate Collection because there's little ultimate about this bare bones piece of product."

Commercial performance
The Ultimate Collection debuted at number eight on the UK Albums Chart with first-week sales of 15,184 copies, becoming Sade's seventh top-10 album in the United Kingdom. In the United States, the album entered the Billboard 200 at number seven with 38,000 copies sold in its first week, earning the band their ninth consecutive top-10 album on the chart. As of August 2011, the set had sold 127,000 copies in the United States.

Track listing

Notes
  signifies a co-producer

Personnel
Credits adapted from the liner notes of The Ultimate Collection.

Sade
 Sade – arrangement ; strings, horns 
 Sade Adu – vocals, programming
 Andrew Hale – keyboards, programming
 Stuart Matthewman – guitars, saxophone, programming
 Paul S. Denman – bass

Additional musicians

 Dave Early – drums, percussion 
 Martin Ditcham – percussion ; drums 
 Paul Cooke – drums 
 Gordon Matthewman – trumpet 
 Terry Bailey – trumpet 
 Pete Beachill – trombone 
 Leroy Osbourne – vocals ; guitar 
 Jake Jacas – vocals 
 Gordon Hunte – guitar 
 Gavyn Wright – orchestra leader 
 Tony Pleeth – solo cello 
 Karl Van Den Bossche – percussion 
 Tony Momrelle – vocals 
 Ian Burdge – cello 
 Noel Langley – trumpet 
 Everton Nelson – violin 
 Pete Lewinson – drums 
 Ryan Waters – guitar 
 Ben Travers – guitar 
 Simon Hale – orchestra arrangement, orchestra conducting 
 Jay-Z – featured artist 
 40 – all instruments except strings and horns

Technical

 Robin Millar – production 
 Mike Pela – production engineering ; engineering ; production ; co-production ; recording ; mixing 
 Pete Brown – engineering assistance 
 Simon Driscoll – engineering assistance 
 Phil Legg – engineering assistance 
 Ben Rogan – production ; engineering, co-production 
 Sade – production 
 Melanie West – engineering assistance 
 Vince McCartney – engineering assistance 
 Franck Segarra – engineering assistance 
 Olivier de Bosson – engineering assistance 
 Alain Lubrano – engineering assistance 
 Jean-Christophe Vareille – engineering assistance 
 Sandro Franchin – engineering assistance 
 Adrian Moore – engineering assistance 
 Marc Williams – engineering assistance 
 Andy "Nipper" Davies – engineering assistance 
 Mark "Spike" Stent – mixing 
 Mat Arnold – engineering assistance 
 Jamie Brownlow – engineering assistance 
 Owen Shiers – engineering assistance 
 Nick Poortman – engineering assistance 
 Brendan Davies – engineering assistance 
 Mike Nyandoro – engineering assistance 
 Gary Thomas – engineering 
 Isobel Griffiths – contractor 
 Noah "40" Shebib – production, engineering 
 Noel Cadastre – engineering 
 Gimel "Young Guru" Keaton – recording (Jay-Z's verse) 
 Noel "Gadget" Campbell – mixing 
 David Strickland – mix assistance 
 Greg Morrison – mix assistance 
 The Neptunes – mixing 
 Lynn Jeffrey – band assistance
 John Davis – mastering
 Adam Brown – tape transfer
 Kevin Vanbergen – tape transfer
 Richard Bowe – archiving

Artwork
 Sophie Muller – photography

Charts

Weekly charts

Year-end charts

Certifications

Release history

References

2011 greatest hits albums
Albums produced by Noah "40" Shebib
Albums produced by Robin Millar
Epic Records compilation albums
RCA Records compilation albums
Sade (band) compilation albums